The East Yangon General Hospital is a public general hospital located in Botataung township, Yangon, Myanmar. It consists of a medical ward, a surgical ward, a pediatrics ward, an obstetrics and gynecology ward, an eye ward,and an ENT ward. The hospital also runs an Emergency department for general medicine, general surgery, O/G and traumatology. It is also the Tertiary Care Teaching Hospital of University of Medicine 1, Yangon, the University of Nursing, Yangon, and the University of Paramedical Science, Yangon.

See also
 List of hospitals in Yangon

References

Hospitals in Yangon
Hospital buildings completed in 1950